Justin Arrowsmith Brown (1904-1933) was an English rower.

Rowing
He competed in the eights at the 1930 British Empire Games for England and won a gold medal.

Personal life
He was in the Royal Air Force (No.4 squadron) at the time of the 1930 Games.

References

1904 births
1933 deaths
English male rowers
Commonwealth Games medallists in rowing
Commonwealth Games gold medallists for England
Rowers at the 1930 British Empire Games
Medallists at the 1930 British Empire Games